Katsuya Toyama (當山克也 , Tōyama Katsuya, born July 21, 1967) is a Japanese sprint canoer who competed in the late 1980s and early 1990s. At the 1988 Summer Olympics in Seoul, he was eliminated in the semifinals of the C-2 1000 m event. Four years later in Barcelona, Toyama was eliminated in the semifinals of both the C-2 500 m and the C-2 1000 m events.

External links
Sports-Reference.com profile

1967 births
Canoeists at the 1988 Summer Olympics
Canoeists at the 1992 Summer Olympics
Japanese male canoeists
Living people
Olympic canoeists of Japan
Asian Games medalists in canoeing
Canoeists at the 1990 Asian Games
Medalists at the 1990 Asian Games
Asian Games silver medalists for Japan